The 1965 East Carolina Pirates football team was an American football team that represented East Carolina College (now known as East Carolina University) as a member of the Southern Conference during the 1965 NCAA University Division football season. In their fourth season under head coach Clarence Stasavich, the team compiled a 9–1 record.

Schedule

References

East Carolina Pirates
East Carolina Pirates football seasons
Citrus Bowl champion seasons
East Carolina Pirates football